The First Presbyterian Church is a historic church building at 4th and Main Streets in Newport, Arkansas  It was designed by architects Sanders & Ginocchio in Classical Revival style and built in 1910.  It is a single-story brick structure, with a shallow hip roof over its main hall.  The entrance is set in a slightly projecting gable-ended section, flanked by Tuscan columns and square pilasters.

The building was listed on the National Register of Historic Places in 1982.

See also
National Register of Historic Places listings in Jackson County, Arkansas

References

Churches on the National Register of Historic Places in Arkansas
Neoclassical architecture in Arkansas
Churches completed in 1910
Buildings and structures in Jackson County, Arkansas
Presbyterian churches in Arkansas
National Register of Historic Places in Jackson County, Arkansas
Newport, Arkansas
Neoclassical church buildings in the United States